

349001–349100 

|-bgcolor=#f2f2f2
| colspan=4 align=center | 
|}

349101–349200 

|-bgcolor=#f2f2f2
| colspan=4 align=center | 
|}

349201–349300 

|-id=237
| 349237 Quaglietti ||  || Luciano Quaglietti (born 1952) is an Italian amateur astronomer and seeker of meteorites. || 
|}

349301–349400 

|-id=386
| 349386 Randywright ||  || Randall P. Wright (born 1948), executive vice-president and chief operating officer at Texas Children's Hospital, holder of a BS in Physics from Eastern Illinois University. || 
|}

349401–349500 

|-id=407
| 349407 Stefaniafoglia ||  || Stefania Foglia (born 1971), sister of Italian amateur astronomer Sergio Foglia at Suno Observatory, where this minor planet was discovered. || 
|-id=499
| 349499 Dechirico ||  || Giorgio de Chirico (1888–1978) was an Italian painter and writer, who founded the metaphysical art movement, deeply influencing surrealism. || 
|}

349501–349600 

|-bgcolor=#f2f2f2
| colspan=4 align=center | 
|}

349601–349700 

|-id=606
| 349606 Fleurance ||  || Fleurance is a once fortified city in Gers, in south-western France. || 
|}

349701–349800 

|-id=785
| 349785 Hsiaotejen ||  || Hsiao Te-Jen (1934–2015), grandfather of Taiwanese co-discoverer Xiangyao Hsiao || 
|}

349801–349900 

|-id=862
| 349862 Modigliani ||  || Amedeo Modigliani (1884–1920) was an Italian painter and sculptor, known for his modern-style nudes and portraits with surreal long faces and necks. || 
|}

349901–350000 

|-bgcolor=#f2f2f2
| colspan=4 align=center | 
|}

References 

349001-350000